Serge Hovey (1920 – 5 May 1989) was a composer and ethnomusicologist.

Life
Hovey was born in New York City in 1920. He studied piano with Edward Steuermann and composition with Hanns Eisler and Arnold Schoenberg. He was musical director for the first American production of Bertolt Brecht's Life of Galileo in Los Angeles in 1947. He composed the theatrical scores for Tevya and His Daughters and The World of Sholom Aleichem, among others.

In 1976, when Jean Redpath began recording the complete songs of Robert Burns, Hovey researched and arranged 324 songs for the project but died before the project could be completed, leaving only seven of the planned twenty-two volumes.

Death
Hovey died in Pacific Palisades, California, after a twenty-year struggle with Lou Gehrig's disease.

References

1920 births
1989 deaths
American male composers
Ethnomusicologists
Musicians from New York City
20th-century American composers
20th-century musicologists
20th-century American male musicians